Myriam David (15 March 1917 – 28 December 2004) was a French psychoanalyst.

1917 births
2004 deaths
French psychoanalysts